Papilio mechowianus is a species of swallowtail butterfly from the genus Papilio that is found in Angola and the Republic of the Congo.

Taxonomy
It is a member of the zenobia species group. In the zenobia group the basic upperside wing pattern is black with white or yellowish bands and spots. The underside is brown and basally there is a red area marked with black stripes and spots. In the discal area there is a yellowish band with black stripes and veins. Females resemble butterflies from the genus Amauris. Both sexes lack tails.

The clade members are:
Papilio cyproeofila Butler, 1868 
Papilio fernandus Fruhstorfer, 1903
Papilio filaprae Suffert, 1904
Papilio gallienus Distant, 1879 
Papilio mechowi Dewitz, 1881
Papilio mechowianus Dewitz, 1885
Papilio nobicea Suffert, 1904 
Papilio zenobia Fabricius, 1775

Description
It is very similar to Papilio cyproeofila. It differs from P. mechowi in having the white band broad. See  original description.

References

External links
 Global Butterfly Information System Images (as  subgenus Druryia)
Butterfly Corner Images from Naturhistorisches Museum Wien

mechowianus
Butterflies described in 1885
Butterflies of Africa
Taxa named by Hermann Dewitz